was a Nippon Professional Baseball pitcher. From 1948 to 1954 he went by the name of Shigeo Sanada.

External links

1923 births
1994 deaths
People from Wakayama (city)
Baseball people from Wakayama Prefecture
Japanese baseball players
Nippon Professional Baseball pitchers
Shochiku Robins players
Hanshin Tigers players
Japanese baseball coaches
Nippon Professional Baseball coaches